Yotham Kunda (born 25 November 1948) is a Zambian boxer. He competed in the men's light welterweight event at the 1972 Summer Olympics.

References

1948 births
Living people
Zambian male boxers
Olympic boxers of Zambia
Boxers at the 1972 Summer Olympics
Place of birth missing (living people)
Light-welterweight boxers